Robert E. Yates (November 20, 1938 – April 16, 2013) was an American football offensive lineman who played college football for Syracuse and professionally in the American Football League (AFL) for the Boston Patriots. Born in Montpelier, Vermont, Yates was a standout student-athlete at Montpelier High School.

At Syracuse, Yates was a member of the undefeated Orange national championship team in 1959. He was named first-team All-American and was later honored as one of the "Forty Four Players of the Century" at Syracuse.

After graduation, Yates was an original member of the AFL's Boston Patriots, playing from 1960 to 1965 as an offensive lineman and kicker.

Yates coached and taught for 34 years at colleges and high schools in Massachusetts and Vermont, including Burlington High School. Steven Yates, one of three sons, played for him at BHS, which saw a football rebirth during Yates’ era from 1979–1987.

In 2012 he was inducted into the inaugural class of the Vermont Sports Hall of Fame.

See also
 Other American Football League players

References

External links
 Vermont Sports Hall of Fame profile

1938 births
2013 deaths
All-American college football players
Boston Patriots players
People from Montpelier, Vermont
Players of American football from Vermont
Syracuse Orange football players
American Football League players